IATC may refer to:

Intermittent automatic train running control, the German Punktförmige Zugbeeinflussung
International Association of Theatre Critics
International Aviation Training Centre
Issaquah Alps Trails Club